Alanizini is a beetle tribe in the Cerambycinae subfamily, containing the single genus Alanizus and the single species Alanizus tortuosus.

References

Cerambycinae